The New York Power Authority (NYPA), officially the Power Authority of the State of New York, is a New York State public-benefit corporation. It is the largest state public power utility in the United States. NYPA provides some of the lowest-cost electricity in the nation, operating 16 generating facilities and more than 1,400 circuit-miles of transmission lines. Its main administrative offices are in White Plains.

NYPA uses no state tax dollars and incurs no state debt, financing its projects principally through the sale of bonds. The bonds are repaid and the projects operated using revenues from operations.

State and federal regulations determine NYPA’s customer base, which includes large and small businesses, not-for-profit organizations, public power systems and government agencies. NYPA also sells electricity to private utilities for resale (without profit) to their customers, and to neighboring states, under federal requirements. Approximately 70 percent of the electricity NYPA produces is clean renewable hydropower.

The New York Power Authority has been financially responsible for the  New York State Canal Corporation since April 2016 and has owned it since January 1, 2017.

Organization
Since 2011, the President and Chief Executive Officer has been Gil C. Quiniones. The executive staff report to a 7-member board. In 2017, it had operating expenses of $2.335 billion, an outstanding debt of $1.305 billion, and a staffing level of 2,327 people.

Operations
Electric power produced from NYPA's facilities – in addition to being sold to large and small businesses, not-for-profit organizations, public power systems, government agencies, private utilities for resale (without profit) to their customers, and neighboring states, under federal requirements – is sold into the wholesale electricity market of New York State, which is administered by the NYISO. One of the larger direct sales customers of electric power is the Metropolitan Transportation Authority. NYPA also provides electrical engineering consulting services to the MTA when the MTA is planning for and building new power facilities.

Facilities

Hydroelectric generation
NYPA operates three large hydroelectric complexes: the 2,441-megawatt (MW) Niagara Power Project, on the Niagara River in Lewiston; the 800-MW St. Lawrence-Franklin D. Roosevelt Power Project, on the St. Lawrence River in Massena; and the 1,160-MW Blenheim-Gilboa Pumped Storage Power Project in the Catskill Mountain towns of North Blenheim and Gilboa.

NYPA also has four small hydro facilities with a net capability of 10-MW: the Ashokan Project in Ulster County, the Crescent Plant in Albany and Saratoga counties, the Gregory B. Jarvis Plant in Oneida County and the Vischer Ferry Plant in Schenectady and Saratoga counties.

Gas-fired generation
Other generating facilities include two highly efficient natural gas-fueled combined cycle power plants: the 150-MW Richard M. Flynn Power Plant, in Holtsville, Long Island and a 500-MW facility, in Astoria, Queens.

Additionally, NYPA operates ten small power plants also fuelled by natural gas. Those sites – six in New York City and one in Long Island – have combined output of 460-MW.

Electric transmission lines
The hub of NYPA’s statewide power transmission facilities is the Frederick R. Clark Energy Center, in Marcy, New York. NYPA’s high-voltage transmission assets include a 765-kilovolt (kV) line that stretches more than 100 miles from the Canada–US border to the Clark Energy Center and almost 1,000 miles of 345-kV power lines that crisscross New York State, including the Marcy South line and a  transmission project, that follows an underground and underwater path from Westchester County to Long Island.

New York State Canal Corporation
The New York Power Authority has been financially responsible for the  New York State Canal Corporation since April 2016 and has owned it since January 1, 2017.

History
New York Governor Roosevelt signed the Power Authority Act into law on April 27, 1931 that established the Power Authority of the State of New York (PASNY); the name was later changed to New York Power Authority (NYPA).

St. Lawrence-Franklin D. Roosevelt Power Project
The International Joint Commission granted its approval for a cross-border construction project in 1952. In 1953, the Federal Power Commission issued a license for NYPA to develop the U.S. portion of a power dam crossing the Canada–US border. On May 13, 1954, President Dwight D. Eisenhower signed legislation that cleared the way for construction of both a hydroelectric facility and the St. Lawrence Seaway.
First power was achieved in July 1958, and on June 27, 1959, Queen Elizabeth II and Vice President Richard M. Nixon formally dedicated the St. Lawrence Project as a symbol of international cooperation. In 1981, NYPA’s half of the cross-border power dam was renamed the St. Lawrence-Franklin D. Roosevelt Power Project in honor of the man who founded the Power Authority half a century earlier.

Niagara Power Project
In 1956, a rock slide destroyed most of the Niagara Mohawk Power Corporation's Schoellkopf hydropower plant, resulting in a power shortage that endangered thousands of local manufacturing jobs. In response to the emergency, Congress passed the Niagara Redevelopment Act in 1957. After obtaining a license from the Federal Power Commission, Robert Moses commenced work on NYPA’s second hydroelectric generating station in early 1958. When it was completed, three years later, the Niagara Power Project was the largest facility of its kind in the Western world. In a recorded message broadcast February 10, 1961, to mark first power, President John F. Kennedy called the Niagara project “an outstanding engineering achievement” and an “example to the world of North American efficiency and determination.”

Blenheim-Gilboa Pumped Storage Power Project Legislation signed by Governor Nelson A. Rockefeller in 1968 allowed NYPA to expand its generation assets and build nuclear and pumped storage power projects. This led to construction of the Blenheim-Gilboa Pumped Storage Power Project, which produced electricity for the first time in July 1973, and the James A. FitzPatrick Nuclear Power Plant (named after a NYPA chairman), in Scriba, Oswego County, where power was first generated in February 1975.

List of Chairs of the New York Power Authority
Francis Patrick Walsh, 1931-1939.
James Cummings Bonbright, 1939-1946.
Maj.-Gen. Francis Bowditch Wilby, 1946-1950.
John Edward Burton, 1950-1954.
Robert Moses, 1954-1963.
James A. FitzPatrick, 1963-1977.
Frederick R. Clark, 1977-1979.
John Stuart Dyson, 1979-1985.
Richard M. Flynn, 1985-1994.
Clarence D. Rappleyea Jr., 1995-2001.
Joseph J. Seymour, 2001-2002.
Louis P. Ciminelli, 2002-2006.
Frank S. McCullough Jr., 2006-2008.
Michael J. Townsend, 2008-2012.
John R. Koelmel, 2012-present.

See also
 Federal Energy Regulatory Commission
 Green Island Power Authority
 Indian Point Energy Center
 James A. FitzPatrick Nuclear Power Plant
 Long Island Power Authority
 New York State Energy Research and Development Authority
 New York State Public Service Commission
 New York State Thruway Authority
 New York energy law

References

External links

Power Authority of the State of New York in the New York Codes, Rules and Regulations

Municipal electric utilities of the United States
Hydroelectric power companies of the United States
1931 establishments in New York (state)
Public benefit corporations in New York (state)
New York
Energy in New York (state)
Energy infrastructure on Long Island, New York